The Battle of Spartolos took place in 429 BC between Athens and the Chalcidian League and their allies, in the early part of the Peloponnesian War.

The fall of Potidaea had failed to stop rebellion against Athens in Chalcidice. In an effort to secure sources of imperial revenue and halt further local rebellions the Athenians sent Xenophon with 2,000 hoplites and 200 cavalry to attack Spartolos. They destroyed the crops outside the city and began negotiating with pro-Athenian factions in Chalcidice, but the anti-Athenian factions asked for help from Olynthus. An army from Chalcidice, Spartolos, and Olynthus met the Athenians in battle, but their hoplites were defeated and they retreated to Spartolos. Their cavalry and peltasts, however, gained the advantage over the Athenian troops. Reinforcements soon arrived from Olynthus, and they launched a second attack on the Athenians. The Athenian hoplites could not come to grips with the enemy light troops or horsemen. Eventually the Athenians panicked and were routed, with all of their generals and 430 other men killed.

In the Athenian tribute list of 429/8 BC the only cities of Chalcidice are: Mende, Aphytis, Scione, Stageira and Acanthus (Athos). Acanthus and Mende had not even joined the Chalcidian League.

Early Stage of Battle

When the phalanxes of the Chalcidians clashed with those of the Athenians, it was clear that the Athenians had a great advantage. The local Chalcidian hoplites made up the centre and right hand portions of the army while hired Peloponnesian forces made up the left side. The locals on the Chalcidian side gave way first, forcing the mercenaries to fall back as well. This left the Chalcidian army worn and strained, and the battle looked very promising for the Athenians.

Later Stage of Battle

After the Chalcidian side was worn down by the Athenians, the Chalcidians were reinforced by troops sent from Olynthus. With the help of the troops from Olynthus, the Chalcidians rallied back against the Athenians much stronger than before. They had learned that the Athenians did not have the experience or equipment to defend against large numbers of javelins, so when they came back strengthened by their allies and with a new tactic, the Chalcidians forced the Athenians to retreat. As the Athenians retreated, Chalcidian cavalry and light infantry chased down the Athenians to inflict further damage upon them. The Athenians tried multiple counter-attacks to defend themselves from further harm, but each time the Chalcidians were able to evade the attacks. The back ranks of Athenian troops began to abandon those at the front, allowing them to be overwhelmed, surrounded, and killed, including their general, Xenophon.

Statistics

On the Athenian side of the battle were 2,000 hoplites, 200 cavalry, and around 500 light troops.

Aftermath
Between a fifth and a fourth of the Athenian troops were killed in this battle- twice as much as was expected prior to the battle. This brutal defeat showed Athens what would be required of them to win the war.

References

Bibliography
Thucydides, ;;Peloponnesian War;;, II, 79

Spartolos
429 BC
420s BC conflicts
Battles in ancient Chalcidice
Spartolos